Motorsport is a popular form of sport in the nation of India. Formula One in particular has taken off in the country in the 2000s, with two Indian driver competing (Narain Karthikeyan and Karun Chandhok) and the first ever Formula One Indian Grand Prix took place in 2011, at the newly built Buddh International Circuit. India itself as a country had its own Formula One team known by the name Force India Formula One Team Limited, founded and managed by a wealthy Indian businessman Vijay Mallya. The team was based at Silverstone, United Kingdom and competed in Formula One for ten consecutive seasons starting from 2008–2018, with achieving very little success on a few occasions and the team's highest position in the Formula One Constructors Championship was fourth in the 2016 season. The Federation of Motor Sports Clubs of India is the official governing body of motorsport in the country.
India also compete in the Moto GP, Moto 3 class with Mahindra Racing. Mahindra are based in Switzerland but holds an Indian licence.

Two Powerboating F1H2O Grand Prix of India took place. The first was held in Mumbai in 2004 while the last Grand Prix took place in 2018 in Amaravati. Since 2018 a team was named Amaravati and competed until 2019 with driver Jonas Anderson finishing the season with equal total points (36) to the 2019 World Champion American Shaun Torrente. The title of "World Champion" was given to Shaun Torrente instead of Jonas Anderson because counting back podium results, Shaun obtained more 2nd positions during the season.

History

On 1 February 2005, Narain Karthikeyan became India's first Formula One racing driver. In March 2007, he also became the first ever Indian-born driver to compete in a NASCAR Series. He debuted in the NASCAR Camping World Truck Series in the Kroger 250. Force India F1 is a Formula One motor racing team. The team was formed in October 2007, when a consortium led by Indian businessmen Vijay Mallya and Michiel Mol bought the Spyker F1 team for € 88 million. After going through 29 races without a point, Force India won their first Formula One World Championship points and podium place when Giancarlo Fisichella finished second in the 2009 Belgian Grand Prix. New Delhi hosted the Indian Grand Prix in 2011 at Buddh International Circuit in Greater Noida, 50 km from New Delhi. In the 2011 Formula One season, 
Karun Chandhok was the test driver for Team Lotus & Narain Karthikeyan was the test driver for HRT. Both Chandhok and Karthikeyan stepped in (for Jarno Trulli and Daniel Ricciardo, respectively) at the 2011 Indian Grand Prix; it was the first time two Indian drivers compete in the same Formula One Grand Prix.

In December 2013, Mahindra Racing join the FIA Formula E Championship. For the first season in 2014–15, Karun Chandhok drives alongside Bruno Senna. Mahindra finishes 8th of the Teams Championship. The Indian driver leaves the team after the first season, and is replaced by Nick Heidfeld.

On 17 January 2022, the city of Hyderabad signed a letter of intent with the FIA, making them a potential new E-Prix for the 2022-2023 Formula E season. On 11 February 2023, Hyderabad will host first ever Hyderabad E-Prix at Hyderabad Street Circuit. This will be debut of Formula E in India. Motorcycle motorsports world championship MotoGP is also decided to make its debut in the country at the Buddh International Circuit, which hosted three Formula One Grand Prix's in the past as discussions have already been held between the Indian Motorsports Federation and the Fédération Internationale de Motocyclisme (FIM), for the Grand Prix of Bharat MotoGP in 2023. It is expected that India being the largest market for two-wheeler vehicles in the world, can hence be an attraction for International Motorcycle racing in the country and can gain a lot of public response and attention.

Venues 

 Buddh International Circuit, Noida
 Cholavaram, Chennai
 Hyderabad Street Circuit, Hyderabad
 Madras Motor Race Track, Chennai
 Kari Motor Speedway, Coimbatore

See also
Formula Manipal
 DJS Racing
 Indian National Rally Championship
 JK Tyre National Racing Championship
 National Automotive Test Track, Indore
 Moto Manipal

References